Kailasanathar Temple is a Siva temple in Ezhur in Namakkal district in Tamil Nadu (India).

Vaippu Sthalam
It is one of the shrines of the Vaippu Sthalams sung by Tamil Saivite Nayanar Appar.

Presiding deity
The presiding deity is known as Kailasanathar.

Speciality
In a pillar Sivalinga, Dakshinamurti, Nandi and Durga sculptures are found.

References

Hindu temples in Namakkal district
Shiva temples in Namakkal district